This is a list of WBC Muaythai European champions, showing every European champion certificated by the World Boxing Council Muaythai (WBC Muaythai). The WBC, which is one of the four major governing bodies in professional boxing, started certifying their own Muay Thai world champions in 19 different weight classes in 2005.

Heavyweight

Cruiserweight

Light Heavyweight

Super middleweight

Middleweight

Super welterweight

Welterweight

Super lightweight

Lightweight

Featherweight

Bantamweight

See also
List of WBC Muaythai world champions
List of WBC Muaythai female world champions
List of WBC Muaythai international champions
List of WBC Muaythai female international champions
List of WBC Muaythai international challenge winners
List of WBC Muaythai female international challenge winners

References

Lists of Muay Thai champions
WBC